Trenton High School may refer to:

Trenton High School (Florida), Trenton, Florida, US
Trenton High School (Trenton, Iowa), Listed on the National Register of Historic Places in Grundy County, Iowa
Trenton High School (Michigan), Trenton, Michigan, US
Trenton High School (Missouri), the current high school in Trenton, Missouri, US
Trenton High School (Trenton, Missouri), the former high school, a historic building
Trenton High School (Nova Scotia), Trenton, Nova Scotia, Canada
Trenton High School (Ontario), Trenton, Ontario, Canada
Trenton High School (Texas), Trenton, Texas, US
Trenton Central High School, Trenton, New Jersey, US
Trenton Central High School West, Trenton, New Jersey, US